Bjørn Berge (born in Sveio, Norway on 23 September 1968) is a Norwegian guitarist and blues artist.

Career 
After being named "Best Musician of the Year" by Dagbladet in 1998, In 2001, he won Spellemannprisen for his album Stringmachine and in 2002 for his album Illustrated Man. He also toured all over Europe gaining more popularity, and won the NBFs Bluespros in 2001. In 2014 Berge replaced Torbjørn Økland as guitarist in the Norwegian band Vamp.

Honors 
1998: Named "Best Musician of the Year" by Dagbladet
2001: Spellemannprisen in the category Blues
2001: NBFs Bluespros 
2002: Spellemannprisen in the category Blues

Discography

References

External links
Official website
Bjorn Berge - Hush on YouTube

Spellemannprisen winners
Grappa Music artists
Norwegian musicians
Musicians from Sveio
1968 births
Living people